was a town located in Agawa District, Kōchi Prefecture, Japan.

As of 2003, the town had an estimated population of 15,645 and a population density of 348.13 persons per km². The total area was 44.94 km².

On January 1, 2008, Haruno was merged into the expanded city of Kōchi.

Haruno Stadium, the prefecture's largest athletics and football stadium, is located here.

External links

 Kōchi official website 

Dissolved municipalities of Kōchi Prefecture
Kōchi